Nus de la Trinitat is a major highway interchange in northern Barcelona, Catalonia, Spain. It was constructed in 1992, for the 1992 Summer Olympics. In fact, it was one of the main components of the Barcelona high-capacity beltway, formed by Ronda Litoral and Ronda de Dalt.

There are four highways converging to the Nus de la Trinitat:

 Ronda de Dalt.
 Ronda Litoral
 C-58 highway
  Barcelona-Montgat motorway.

Nus de la Trinitat is the busiest traffic junction in Barcelona since four primary motorways converge there and is frequently saturated on rush hour.

Road interchanges in Spain
Road bridges in Spain
Transport in Sant Andreu
Roads in Barcelona
Motorways in Catalonia